Kings Land o' Lakes Airport  is a public use airport located one nautical mile (1.85 km) southeast of the central business district of the unincorporated community of Land o' Lakes in the town of Land o' Lakes, Vilas County, Wisconsin, United States. It is owned by the town of Land o' Lakes. It is included in the Federal Aviation Administration (FAA) National Plan of Integrated Airport Systems for 2021–2025, in which it is categorized as a local general aviation facility.

Although most U.S. airports use the same three-letter location identifier for the FAA and IATA, this airport is assigned LNL by the FAA but has no designation from the IATA.

Facilities and aircraft 
It has two runways:

14/32 is an asphalt runway 4,001 by 75 feet (1,219 x 23 m) with approved GPS approaches and 5/23 is 2,577 by 130 feet (785 x 40 m) with a turf surface. The Land o' Lakes NDB navaid (LNL), frequency 396 kHz, is located on the field.

For the 12-month period ending September 8, 2022, the airport had 8,100 aircraft operations, an average of 22 per day: 99% general aviation and 1% air taxi. In February 2023, there were 14 aircraft based at this airport: all 14 single-engine.

See also
 List of airports in Wisconsin

References

External links 
 King's Land O'Lakes (LNL) at Wisconsin DOT Airport Directory
 

Airports in Wisconsin
Buildings and structures in Vilas County, Wisconsin